The Ryerson Index is an online index of death notices from Australian newspapers, past and present, compiled by the Sydney-based non-profit organisation Ryerson Index Incorporated. The index database has in excess of 5 million records compiled from more than 280 newspapers across Australia. Obituaries, funeral notices and probate notices are also included. Indexing uses the crowdsourcing model, and is continuously updated by volunteers over the internet.

The idea of an index was first suggested by John Graham of the Sydney Dead Persons Society in 1998. The concept gained momentum the following year when another member of the society, Joyce Ryerson, revealed that she had a 14-year collection of death notices from The Sydney Morning Herald kept in her laundry. A team of volunteers worked three years to compile the index from this initial material. Following this, additional records from other newspapers were added, and by 2005, there were one million entries. The Ryerson Index was named in honor of Joyce Ryerson's invaluable contributions; she died on 30 August 2012. The intention of the index is to help researchers locate notices in original published sources rather than act as a primary source.

Currently, the index is used by both genealogists and non-genealogists all over Australia and countries worldwide.

References

External links 
 Ryerson Index

Genealogy databases
Online databases
History websites of Australia